Veliki Gradac  is a village in central Croatia, in the municipality/town of Glina, Sisak-Moslavina County.

History

Demographics
According to the 2011 census, the village of Veliki Gradac has 126 inhabitants, many of whom are elderly. 
This represents 17.80% of its pre-war population according to the 1991 census. 

Population by ethnicity

References

External links

Populated places in Sisak-Moslavina County
Serb communities in Croatia
Glina, Croatia